Eiffel may refer to:

Places
 Eiffel Peak, a summit in Alberta, Canada
 Champ de Mars – Tour Eiffel station, Paris, France; a transit station

Structures
 Eiffel Tower, in Paris, France, designed by Gustave Eiffel
 Eiffel Bridge, Ungheni, Moldova, designed by Gustave Eiffel
 Eiffel Bridge, Láchar, Spain, built by the studio of Gustave Eiffel
 Eiffel Bridge, Zrenjanin, Serbia, built by Gustave Eiffel's company
 Eiffel Building, Sao Paulo, Brazil; a mixed use building

Education
 Eiffel School of Management (est. 2007), Creteil, France
 Gustave Eiffel French School of Budapest, Hungary
 Gustave Eiffel University (est. 2020), Champs-sur-Marne, Marne la Vallée, France
 Lycée Gustave Eiffel (disambiguation)

Music
 Eiffel 65, an Italian electronic music group, originally called Eiffel
 Eiffel (band), a French rock group
 5 Eiffel (EP), a 1982 record by Kim Larsen
 "Alec Eiffel", a song by the alternative rock band Pixies

Other uses
 Eiffel (company), successor of Gustave Eiffel's engineering company
 Eiffel (film), a 2021 French film
 Eiffel (programming language), developed by Bertrand Meyer
 EiffelStudio, a development environment for the programming language
 Visual Eiffel
 Eiffel Forum License, a free software license

People with the surname
 Erika Eiffel, American woman who "married" the Eiffel Tower
 Gustave Eiffel (1832–1923), engineer and designer of the Eiffel Tower and the Statue of Liberty

See also

 Eiffel Tower (disambiguation)
 Eiffel Bridge (disambiguation)
 Tour Eiffel (disambiguation)
 Gustave Eiffel (disambiguation)
 
 Eifel, a mountain region in Germany, Belgium and Luxembourg
 Jean Effel (1908–1982), French painter, caricaturist, illustrator and journalist